Abra Katabra (Greek: Άμπρα κατάμπρα; English: Abracadabra) is an album by popular Greek singer, Marianta Pieridi. It was released in Greece in December 2004 by Universal Music Greece.

Track listing

References

2004 albums
Greek-language albums
Mariada Pieridi albums
Universal Music Greece albums